Popcorn, or pop corn, is a variety of corn kernel, which forcefully expands and puffs up when heated. 

Popcorn, or pop corn, may also refer to:

Geography 
 Popcorn, Indiana, United States

People
 Faith Popcorn (born 1943), futurist
 Marvin Sutton (1946–2009), American Appalachian moonshiner known as "Popcorn"
 Richard "Popcorn" Wylie (1939–2008), American R&B musician, songwriter and record producer

Arts, entertainment, and media

Films
 Popcorn (1991 film), a horror film
 Pop Corn (2003 film), a Tamil drama film
 Popcorn (2007 film), a teen comedy
 Popcorn, a 1969 music documentary directed by Peter Clifton

Literature
 Popcorn (novel), a 1996 novel by Ben Elton
 Popcorn (play), a 1998 adaptation of Elton's novel

Music
 Popcorn (music style), a music subculture and style originally established in Belgium, and based on dancing to R&B and pop records

Albums and box sets
 Popcorn (Arashi album), 2012
 Popcorn (Luiz Henrique and Walter Wanderley album), 1967 
 Popcorn, an album by Tammie Brown
 Popcorn, an album by Moonstar88
 Popcorn, a box set by The Cocktails
 The Popcorn (album), an album by James Brown

Songs
 "Popcorn" (instrumental), a 1969 composition by Gershon Kingsley, covered by Hot Butter in 1972 and several other artists
 "Popcorn", a song by US musician Kovas from The Arrogance of Youth 2008
 "The Popcorn", a 1969 instrumental by James Brown

Other arts, entertainment, and media
 "Popcorn", a 1983 episode of the American TV sitcom Silver Spoons
 Popcorn (TV series) Italian pop music show 1980-1985
 PopCorn (video game), a 1989 breakout clone (sub-class of the "bat-and-ball" videogame genre)
 "Popcorn", a poem by Raffi from his 1979 album The Corner Grocery Store

Computing and technology
 POPCORN (767-2676), a phoneword used in parts of the United States to reach the speaking clock or local time & temperature information
 Popcorn Time, a multi-platform open-source Bittorrent-based streaming media player
 popcorn.js, an open source JavaScript and HTML5 media framework

Enterprises
 Popcorn.net, a movie download service
 Tseung Kwan O station also known as "Popcorn Mall", a shopping mall in Hong Kong

Popcorn-like formations and substances
 Cave popcorn, a common cave formation
 Foam peanut or packing peanut, sometimes referred to as popcorn
 Popcorn ceiling, a decorative ceiling treatment
 Popcorn lung, an informal name for bronchiolitis obliterans (BO), a lung disease 
 Popcorn noise, a burst noise of electronic components

Other uses
 Popcorn function, a mathematical function
 Popcorning, a sporadic jumping behavior of guinea pigs

See also
 Pop Carn (2003 film), a Tamil film